State Route 476 (SR 476) is a state highway in Tennessee designated in 2007, located north and west of Winchester. It was created as an access road to Tims Ford Lake, which it crosses twice, and Tims Ford State Park. The route is located entirely in Franklin County, Tennessee.

Route description

SR 476 begins at SR 50 west of Winchester in the community of Broadview. It goes northwest as Mansford Road through farmland before crossing its first bridge over the Elk River/Tims Ford Lake. SR 476 then passes through Tims Ford State Park before coming to an intersection with Awalt Road, which it turns right onto to cross the second bridge over Tims Ford Lake. It then continues northeast through rural areas before to an end at a y-intersection with SR 130 just south of Tullahoma. The entire route of SR 476 is a rural two-lane highway.

Major intersections

See also

References

476
Transportation in Franklin County, Tennessee